Borotou is a town in northwest Ivory Coast. It is a sub-prefecture and commune of Koro Department in Bafing Region, Woroba District.

In 2014, the population of the sub-prefecture of Borotou was 5,353.

Villages
The nine villages of the sub-prefecture of Borotou and their population in 2014 are:
 Borotou (2 203)
 Ouassiko (28)
 Sekodougou (124)
 Bambadougou (839)
 Bilalo (278)
 Moyendougou (135)
 Niamoutou (987)
 Tiékoronidougou (433)
 Zoumassadougou (326)

Notes

Sub-prefectures of Bafing Region
Communes of Bafing Region